Doug Jones is an American curler.

Awards
USA Curling Male Athlete of the Year: 1990, 1992.

Teams

Men's

Mixed

References

External links
 

Living people
American male curlers
American curling champions
Year of birth missing (living people)